The Turkish President Recep Tayyip Erdoğan is the presidential candidate for the Presidential elections 2023. Erdoğan is the candidate of the People's Alliance consisting of the Justice and Development Party (AKP) and the Nationalist Movement Party (MHP).

Background 
In Turkey Presidents are subject to a limit of two 5-year terms. Recep Tayyip Erdoğan supporters contend that the Turkish presidency has assmuned a new role in the Constitutional Referendum of 2017, others recall article 101 of the Turkish constitution which limits the presidency to two terms. The same article would allow a third term if elections were held before the end of the second term. In February 2022 the Parliamentary Speaker of the Grand National Assembly of Turkey Mustafa Sentop claimed Erdoğan could run for a third presidency despite a two term limit to the presidency in the Turkish constitution. The same month Devlet Bahceli of the MHP called for necessary legal requirements to enable a third candidacy of Erdoğan, while Kemal Kılıçdaroğlu from the oppositional Republican People's Party (CHP) also agreed to Erdoğans candidacy. Eventually AKP officials claimed that the presidential term before the Presidential Referendum in 2017 is considered as a valid term. In December 2022, Erdogan announced the term from 2023 onwards would be his last.

Announcement 
On 9 June 2022, Recep Tayyip Erdoğan announced his candidacy during a speech in Izmir at the Aegean sea. In the same speech, ending speculations on the election date, he assured them that the elections would be in June 2023 and also demanded for the oppositional Nation Alliance to also announce their candidate. Since early January 2023 it was speculated on eventual snap elections before June 2023. The AKP mentioned the dates of the 16, 30 April and the 14 May. But the so called "Table of Six" composed by six opposition parties announced that they would not agree to snap elections after the 6 April. 

In January 2023, Erdogan mentioned the 14 May 2023 as the date of the elections, as on the 14 May 1950 Adnan Menderes became prime minister after a victorious in the first multiparty elections of Turkey.

References 

Election campaigns in Turkey
Recep Tayyip Erdoğan
2023 elections in Turkey